Városi Stadion may refer to:

 Városi Stadion (Nyíregyháza)
 Városi Stadion (Tatabánya)
 Városi Stadion (Vác)